Radoslav was a Serbian Prince (Knez, Archont) who ruled over the early medieval Principality of Serbia at the beginning of the 9th century. He succeeded his father, prince Višeslav, who ruled at the end of the 8th century. Radoslav was succeeded by his son, prince Prosigoj.

According to De Administrando Imperio, compiled by the Byzantine Emperor Constantine VII Porphyrogenitus, during the reign of princes Višeslav, Radoslav and Prosigoj there was no war between the Serbian Principality and its eastern neighbour, the Bulgarian Khanate.

Radoslav or his son was the ruler of Serbia during the uprisings (819–822) of Ljudevit Posavski against the Franks. According to the Royal Frankish Annals, in 822, Ljudevit went from his seat in Sisak to the Serbs, somewhere in western Bosnia. Under the same entry, the Royal Frankish Annals state that Serbs were controlling a great part of Dalmatia ("ad Sorabos, quae natio magnam Dalmatiae partem obtinere dicitur") but according to John (Jr.) Fine, it was hard to find Serbs in this area since the Byzantine sources were limited to the southern coast, also it is possible that among other tribes exists tribe or group of small tribes of Serbs. However, the mentioning of "Dalmatia" in 822 and 833 as an old geographical term by the authors of Frankish Annals was Pars pro toto with a vague perception of what this geographical term actually referred to.

During the reign of prince Radoslav, and his immediate predecessors and successors, the process of gradual Christianization of the Serbs was still going on, starting in the first half of the 7th century and finally ending by the middle of the 9th century.

See also

 History of the Serbs
 Vlastimirović dynasty
 Early Medieval Principality of Serbia

References

Sources 
Primary sources

 
 
 
 

Secondary sources

 
 
 
 
 
 
 

9th-century Serbian monarchs
9th-century rulers in Europe
Vlastimirović dynasty
Slavic warriors